Men's Giant Slalom World Cup 1986/1987

Final point standings

In Men's Giant Slalom World Cup 1986/87 the best five results count.

References
 fis-ski.com

World Cup
FIS Alpine Ski World Cup men's giant slalom discipline titles